Nathaniel Thomas Huffman (April 2, 1975 – October 15, 2015) was an American professional basketball player, who played most of his career with Maccabi Tel Aviv. He was the 2001 Israeli Basketball Premier League MVP.

High school and college career
Huffman played for Lakeview High School and then for Lansing Community College (where in '94–'95 he averaged 29.8 points, 14.5 rebounds, and 6 blocks per game while shooting 66.8% from the field, and was named to the JUCO All America team).  He then played for Central Michigan University from 1995 until 1997 (where in '96–'97 he averaged 17.2 points, 11 rebounds (leading the Mid-America Conference in rebounding), and 1.8 blocks per game, and was named to the MAC Conference 1st team).

Professional career
After college, Huffman signed as a free agent with the Los Angeles Clippers, but did not make the team. In the 1997–98 season, he played for the Idaho Stampede of the CBA. He was second in the league in blocked shots per game (1.8), 6th in field goal percentage (.553), 8th in rebounds per game (7.6), and 10th in free throw percentage (.801). He was selected to the CBA All-Rookie Team in 1998.

He then moved to Europe, and played for Baloncesto Fuenlabrada of the Spanish ACB League.

In the 1999–00 season, he was signed by Maccabi Tel Aviv. During his time in Israel, he won three Israeli Premier League championships and Israeli State Cups, and one European FIBA SuproLeague title (2001; when he averaged 17.5 points and 9 rebounds, while playing 30 minutes per game, as the team was 21–3). He was named the FIBA SuproLeague Player of the Year, as well as the "Best American Player in Europe", by Basket News, in 2001.

After his successes in Israel, he was signed in July 2002, by the Toronto Raptors of the NBA to a 3-year, $5.2 million contract (the third year being a team option), and appeared in 7 games, averaging 3.3 points, 3.3 rebounds and 10.9 minutes. Shortly after, Huffman was released by Toronto which terminated his contract in January 2003, because team management charged that he hid a knee injury from them when he signed the contract. Huffman responded by suing them in 2003. In February 2004 an arbitrator ruled that the Raptors were responsible for Huffman's contract.

Later life and death
After his basketball career, he decided to fund a basketball camp for children in 2005, with retired Romanian-Israeli basketball player Constantin Popa. Huffman was awarded in 2010, by the Michigan Jewish Sports Foundation, with the Book of Life Award.

On September 29, 2015, Huffman announced that he had Stage 4 bladder cancer, and his "condition is terminal". He died on October 15, 2015.

References

External links
 
 Nate Huffman at acb.com 
 Nate Huffman at draftexpress.com
 Nate Huffman at eurobasket.com
 Nate Huffman at euroleague.net
 Nate Huffman at fibaeurope.com
 Nate Huffman at nba.com

1975 births
2015 deaths
American expatriate basketball people in Canada
American expatriate basketball people in Israel
American expatriate basketball people in Spain
American men's basketball players
Baloncesto Fuenlabrada players
Basketball players from Michigan
Deaths from cancer in Michigan
Centers (basketball)
Central Michigan Chippewas men's basketball players
Deaths from bladder cancer
Idaho Stampede (CBA) players
Israeli Basketball Premier League players
Jewish American sportspeople
Jewish men's basketball players
Junior college men's basketball players in the United States
Liga ACB players
Maccabi Tel Aviv B.C. players
Sportspeople from Battle Creek, Michigan
Toronto Raptors players
Undrafted National Basketball Association players
21st-century American Jews